Iliff station is a Regional Transportation District (RTD) light rail station in Aurora, Colorado. The station is located alongside Interstate 225 at Iliff Avenue, a little more than one block west of South Blackhawk Street. The station opened on February 24, 2017, and is served by the H and R lines. Iliff station has a 600 space parking structure owned and operated by the City of Aurora. A transit-oriented development project including 424 residences is under construction southeast of the station.

References 

RTD light rail stations
Transportation buildings and structures in Aurora, Colorado
Railway stations in the United States opened in 2017
2017 establishments in Colorado